Mateusz Maćkowiak (born 29 May 2001) is a Polish professional footballer who plays as a left-back for II liga side Stomil Olsztyn, on loan from Śląsk Wrocław.

Career statistics

Club

Notes

References

2001 births
Living people
Footballers from Poznań
Polish footballers
Poland youth international footballers
Association football defenders
I liga players
II liga players
III liga players
Warta Poznań players
Pogoń Szczecin players
RB Leipzig players
Śląsk Wrocław players
Odra Opole players
OKS Stomil Olsztyn players
Polish expatriate footballers
Polish expatriate sportspeople in Germany
Expatriate footballers in Germany